African Reinsurance Corporation, generally known as Africa Re, is a reinsurance company based in Lagos, Nigeria. Africa Re was founded on 24 February 1976 in Yaoundé, Cameroon making it Africa's first continental reinsurer. The company operates in 41 countries of the African Union through approximately 107 insurance/reinsurance companies.

The creation of the pan-African reinsurer was intended to limit the outflow of foreign currency from Africa and promote the development of the insurance market there. The Yaoundé Agreement  also encouraged any national African insurance and/or reinsurance institution to contribute to the company's capital.

History

The early days of Africa Re 
The idea of developing a local insurance and reinsurance market in developing countries was born in the early 1970s within international institutions. Only economically mature countries had companies operating in this sector at the time. In Africa, the obstacles facing the project were numerous, given the continent's lack of human and material resources and its political, economic, cultural and linguistic disparities. It was in this context that Africa Re was established in Yaoundé (Cameroon) on 24 February 1976. Its authorized capital of 15 million USD was then shared between the African Development Bank (ADB) and 36 member states of the Organization of African Unity (OAU).

The ambition is to curb the outflow of foreign currency from the continent, mobilize local capital, create a reinsurance market and support African economic development. The company started its activities in Accra (Ghana)  before moving, a few months later, to Lagos (Nigeria). In 1980, Africa Re opened its first regional office in Morocco. Kenya (1982) and Côte d'Ivoire (1987) then followed.

An eventful start 
The deteriorating socio-economic and political context of the 1980s and 1990s affected business activity on the continent. The structural and monetary adjustment plans imposed by the International Monetary Fund (IMF) threatened companies and weakened the insurance and reinsurance sector.

In response to this situation, the Board of Directors decided in 1990 to increase the capital to 30 million USD and to open it to African and foreign companies. Between 1982 and 1993, five other African states, convinced by the project, joined the ranks of State shareholders, whose number went from 36 to 41.

The development on an African scale 
The advent of democracy in South Africa and the country's integration into the OAU in 1994 marked a fresh beginning for Africa Re. The establishment of a contact office in Johannesburg in 1995 gave the company access to the most important African insurance market, which remains its main source of business to this day.

In order to provide the financial resources necessary for the company's expansion, a second capital increase was decided in 1997. The capital increased from 30 to 50 million USD. A contact office (transformed into a regional office in 2003) was then opened in 1997 in Mauritius.

The “Africa Re House”, the company's new headquarters, was built in 2000 in the commercial district known as Victoria Island in Lagos. New premises were also built in Abidjan in 2001, in Nairobi in 2003 and in Casablanca in 2005.

The capital was doubled in 2001, reaching 100 million USD, to finance the company's development on the continent. To cover Northeast Africa, the Cairo (Egypt) office was created in 2001. This became a regional office in 2004  while the Johannesburg office was established as a subsidiary in the same year.

Between 2004 and 2005, four financial institutions acquired a 20% stake in Africa Re; however, it was only in 2010 that the reinsurer reached its pan-African dimension. The threefold increase in capital to 300 million USD allowed Africa Re to complete its coverage of the continent. In 2010, a subsidiary was created in Cairo to support the emerging development of Islamic reinsurance, the new company, Africa Retakaful, operating mainly in the MENA region. In 2011, a local office was set up  in Ethiopia in order to strengthen the company's presence in the strategic region of East Africa.

International expansion 
Segmentation of risks and their dispersion in space are driving the international development of reinsurers. Through its presence in the African market, Africa Re has attracted foreign companies that wanted to gain a foothold in Africa.

This is how IRB Brasil Re became a shareholder in 2012. This alliance also gave Africa Re operator status in Brazil and the opportunity to expand its operations in Latin America.

The year 2015 marked the entry of two new shareholders, Axa and Fairfax Financial Holdings  with a stake of 7.15% each.

In 2018, Allianz acquired IRB Brasil's 8% stake in Africa Re.

Share capital 
The company, which was set up with a share capital of 15 million USD, has carried out several capital increases:

Shareholding 
The launch of Africa Re was the result of an association between the African Development Bank (AfDB) and 36 member states of the Organisation of African Unity (OAU).

 In 1992, 16 years after the company was launched, new countries joined the founding members, bringing the number of state shareholders to 41.
 In the same year (1992), shareholding was extended to insurance companies that are majority owned by African legal entities.
 The year 2001 was an important turning point in the company's history as it opened up to non-African foreign investors. Four development finance institutions (DFIs) acquired a stake in the company's share capital.
 International Finance Corporation (IFC), a subsidiary of the World Bank
 Deutsche Investitions- und Entwicklungsgesellschaft (DEG), German investment and development company, member of the KfW banking group
 FMO, Entrepreneurial Development Bank of the Netherlands
 Promotion et Participation pour la Coopération (PROPARCO), French development finance institution, member of the French Development Agency Group (AFD)
 In 2012, IRB-Brasil Re became the first non-African reinsurer to become a shareholder of  the company. This equity participation helped Africa Re to obtain the status of operator in Brazil, thereby expanding its activities to Latin America.
 In 2015, two new major non-African shareholders joined the company. These were AXA, one of the world's leading insurance companies, and Fairfax Financial Holdings, a Canadian holding company with a strong portfolio in insurance and reinsurance. These two shareholders acquired the shares belonging to the Development Finance Institutions. 
 In 2018, Allianz acquired the 8% stake of IRB Brasil in Africa Re.
 As of 31 December 2021, 113 insurance and reinsurance companies on the continent are shareholders of Africa Re, as well as 42 States, the African Development Bank (ADB) and three international groups.

Organization and structures 
Africa Re's governance is organized around a Board of Directors and a management team with Dr. Mohamed Ahmed Maait serving as the Chairman of the group and Dr. Corneille Karekezi as the Group Managing Director and CEO.

Chairmen and General Managers 
In its 45 years of business, Africa Re has only had seven changes in the board of directors and four changes in senior management.

Main activities 
The company's portfolio consists of facultative treaties and risks in both life and non-life classes of business. The non-life activity is dominated by fire and accident. In 2021, these two classes of business account for nearly 69% of the portfolio, that is, 579 million USD of premiums.

Geographical organization 
Africa Re's geographical organization is presented as follows in 2020:

 One Head office in Lagos (Nigeria);
 Two subsidiaries: Africa Re South Africa in Johannesburg (South Africa) and Africa Retakaful in Cairo (Egypt);
 Six regional offices: Casablanca (Morocco), Abidjan ( Côte d'Ivoire), Nairobi (Kenya), Lagos (Nigeria), Cairo (Egypt) and Ebene (Mauritius);
 One local office in Addis Ababa (Ethiopia);
 One underwriting representative in Kampala (Uganda).

Financial and technical data

The Africa Re Foundation

History 
In 2014, Africa Re established a fund to finance corporate social responsibility (CSR) projects. This initiative follows a November 2013 board of directors' decision that allocated up to 2% of the annual net profit to CSR projects in the 41 member States. 

The Africa Re Foundation was created on 19 January 2018 to steer this fund, which was initially managed internally. The new entity, based in Mauritius and operational since January 2019, is responsible for managing the fund and ensuring the implementation of the various CSR projects.

Governance of the foundation 
The Africa Re Foundation's Board of Directors is made up of insurance professionals. They are chosen to ensure fair representation of all regions of the continent.

Objectives of the Africa Re Foundation 
The development of insurance on the continent is one of Africa Re's objectives. The foundation, in charge of conveying this ideal, contributes to the financing of corporate social responsibility projects by:

 Granting subsidies and carrying out activities that contribute to the growth of insurance, the promotion of risk management solutions and the development of regional and continental partnerships; 
 Raising awareness of major risks that could hamper the economic development of member countries; 
 Supporting innovation and research for the development of new risk prevention mechanisms;
 Supporting the training and development of young insurance professionals in African markets.

See also 
 Swiss Re
 Kenya Re
 African Development Bank

References 

Companies based in Lagos
Insurance companies of Nigeria
Reinsurance companies
Financial services companies established in 1976
Nigerian companies established in 1976